Paul Hills (born 20 September 1972) is a former Australian rules footballer who played with Essendon in the Australian Football League (AFL).

Hills usually played on the wing and after being recruited from North Ballarat he joined Essendon for the 1991 season despite not having played a reserves game. In 1993 he was part of the premiership side, playing 20 games during the year for 357 disposals.

The following season he suffered form and injury problems and until he was delisted in 1996 he managed to add just 11 more games.

Statistics

|-
|- style="background-color: #EAEAEA"
! scope="row" style="text-align:center" | 1991
|style="text-align:center;"|
| 49 || 14 || 3 || 3 || 95 || 109 || 204 || 34 || 20 || 0.2 || 0.2 || 6.8 || 7.8 || 14.6 || 2.4 || 1.4 || 1
|-
! scope="row" style="text-align:center" | 1992
|style="text-align:center;"|
| 33 || 17 || 3 || 6 || 145 || 162 || 307 || 56 || 25 || 0.2 || 0.4 || 8.5 || 9.5 || 18.1 || 3.3 || 1.5 || 6
|- style="background-color: #EAEAEA"
|style="text-align:center;background:#afe6ba;"|1993†
|style="text-align:center;"|
| 11 || 20 || 3 || 6 || 192 || 165 || 357 || 49 || 27 || 0.2 || 0.3 || 9.6 || 8.3 || 17.9 || 2.5 || 1.4 || 0
|-
! scope="row" style="text-align:center" | 1994
|style="text-align:center;"|
| 11 || 8 || 1 || 1 || 51 || 48 || 99 || 16 || 8 || 0.1 || 0.1 || 6.4 || 6.0 || 12.4 || 2.0 || 1.0 || 0
|- style="background-color: #EAEAEA"
! scope="row" style="text-align:center" | 1995
|style="text-align:center;"|
| 11 || 3 || 1 || 1 || 18 || 14 || 32 || 4 || 1 || 0.3 || 0.3 || 6.0 || 4.7 || 10.7 || 1.3 || 0.3 || 0
|-
! scope="row" style="text-align:center" | 1996
|style="text-align:center;"|
| 11 || 1 || 0 || 0 || 1 || 5 || 6 || 0 || 0 || 0.0 || 0.0 || 1.0 || 5.0 || 6.0 || 0.0 || 0.0 || 0
|- class="sortbottom"
! colspan=3| Career
! 63
! 11
! 17
! 502
! 503
! 1005
! 159
! 81
! 0.2
! 0.3
! 8.0
! 8.0
! 16.0
! 2.5
! 1.3
! 7
|}

References

External links

1972 births
Living people
Australian rules footballers from Victoria (Australia)
Essendon Football Club players
Essendon Football Club Premiership players
North Ballarat Football Club players
One-time VFL/AFL Premiership players